The men's 400 metre individual medley competition of the swimming events was held on July 31 with the semifinals and the final.

Records
Prior to the competition, the existing world and championship records were as follows.

Results

Heats
34 swimmers participated in 5 heats.

Final
The final was held at 18:09.

References

External links
2011 World Aquatics Championships: Men's 400 metre individual medley entry list, from OmegaTiming.com; retrieved 2011-07-23.

Individual medley 400 metre, men's
World Aquatics Championships